Distinguished Public Service Medal may be one of the following decorations of the United States:

 Army Distinguished Public Service Medal
 Department of Defense Medal for Distinguished Public Service
 Merchant Marine Distinguished Service Medal
 Mineralogical Society of America Distinguished Public Service Medal
 NASA Distinguished Service Medal
 NASA Distinguished Public Service Medal (awarded to non-government personnel)
 National Intelligence Distinguished Public Service Medal
 Public Health Service Distinguished Service Medal

Distinguished Public Service Award may be one of the following decorations of the United States:

 Coast Guard Distinguished Public Service Award
 Navy Distinguished Public Service Award
 Secretary of the Air Force Distinguished Public Service Award
 Secretary's Distinguished Service Award from the United States Department of State

See also 

 Awards and decorations of the United States government